The Fort Pike Bridge (also known as the Rigolets Bridge), named after nearby Fort Pike, carries U.S. Route 90 across the Rigolets on the eastern side of Lake Pontchartrain between New Orleans and Slidell in Louisiana.  It is owned and operated by Louisiana Department of Transportation and Development The bridge opened on June 9, 1930, and along with the Chef Menteur Bridge provided a free route between New Orleans and the Mississippi Gulf Coast. This was the site of Jayne Mansfield's death in June 1967. A new span was constructed just to the north of the old span.

High-rise replacement
Construction of a new $50 million high-rise bridge began in October 2004. The new bridge was built by Massman Construction Co., of Kansas City, MO. It was delayed by Hurricane Katrina in 2005, which pushed a devastating storm surge through the area. The new bridge is just over one mile (1.6 km) in length and features two  lanes with  shoulders on both sides. The new span opened to traffic on January 15, 2008. After completion of the new span, the old bridge was demolished.

See also

References

Bridges in New Orleans
Bridges completed in 1930
Bridges completed in 2008
Swing bridges in the United States
Road bridges in Louisiana
U.S. Route 90
Bridges of the United States Numbered Highway System
Slidell, Louisiana
Box girder bridges in the United States